Ben F. Branch (January 8, 1928 – August 27, 1987) was an American entrepreneur, jazz tenor saxophonist, and bandleader.

Although possibly better known as being the last person Martin Luther King Jr. spoke to moments before his assassination in 1968, Branch had been a jazz bandleader for many years.

Musical career
With his brother, Thomas, on trumpet, Branch was a member of the horn section on B.B. King's first recordings for Bullet Records in 1949. "My very first recordings were for a company out of Nashville called Bullet, the Bullet Record Transcription company," King recalls. "I had horns that very first session. I had Phineas Newborn on piano; his father played drums, and his brother, Calvin, played guitar with me. I had Tuff Green on bass, Ben Branch on tenor sax, his brother, Thomas Branch, on trumpet, and a lady trombone player."

Branch recorded with King again on an early 1952 Memphis recording with the B.B. King Orchestra with, among others, Hank Crawford and Ike Turner.

For much of the 1950s, Branch was the bandleader for the house band, the Largos, at Curry's Club in North Memphis, which provided a young Isaac Hayes with his first professional gigs.

Future M.G.'s bassist Donald "Duck" Dunn was the first white member of Branch's big band, in the early 1960s.

In 1982, Branch founded the American Music Hall of Fame, a private music school in Chicago.

A few months before his death, Branch appeared with his band at the 1987 Chicago Blues Festival backing Rosco Gordon.

Branch also recorded with Brother Jack McDuff and Etta James, Little Milton, and Phil Upchurch.

Branch held a degree in music from Tennessee State University.

Business career
Branch was president of Doctor Branch Products Inc., founded in 1983, in Chicago, Illinois, the nation's only black-owned soft-drink manufacturing company. The company eventually signed a $355 million agreement with Kemmerer Bottling Group, bottler of several well-known soft drinks, including 7Up, to distribute the Doctor Branch Products beverages.

Operation Breadbasket
As musical director for the SCLC's Operation Breadbasket, he led the Breadbasket Orchestra and Choir that performed benefits for Dr. Martin Luther King Jr. and Operation/PUSH. Just moments before being assassinated, Dr. King had just asked Branch to play a Negro spiritual, "Precious Lord, Take My Hand," at a rally that was to have been held two hours later. King's exact words (which were also the last words that he ever spoke) were "Ben, make sure you play 'Take My Hand, Precious Lord' in the meeting tonight. Play it real pretty."

Cannonball Adderley, in the introduction to the title track of his 1969 album Country Preacher, makes a specific mention of Branch in recognition of his work as leader of the Operation Breadbasket Orchestra and Choir.

While musical director of the Breadbasket Orchestra and Operation/PUSH, he arranged for gospel singer Deleon Richards to perform at the Chicago Stadium (later the United Center).

Discography
1964: "Beach Bash"/"Bush Bash" - The Mar-Keys - Wayne Jackson (tp) Ben Branch (ts) Floyd Newman (bars) Booker T. Jones (org) Steve Cropper (g) Donald "Duck" Dunn (el-b) Al Jackson (d) (Stax 45-156)
1968: The Last Request - Operation Breadbasket Orchestra and choir (Chess)
1969: Gin and Orange – Brother Jack McDuff

References

1928 births
1987 deaths
American bandleaders
American jazz tenor saxophonists
American male saxophonists
American blues saxophonists
American rhythm and blues musicians
African-American saxophonists
Assassination of Martin Luther King Jr.
20th-century American musicians
20th-century saxophonists
American male jazz musicians
20th-century American male musicians